The Jersey Flegg Cup is a junior rugby league competition played in New South Wales, contested among teams made up of players aged 21 or under. The competition is administered by the New South Wales Rugby League (NSWRL), and is named for Eastern Suburbs foundation player and prominent administrator of the game, Harry "Jersey" Flegg.

History 
The Jersey Flegg Cup began in 1961 as an under-19 age group competition and was originally played over 9–12 weeks early in the season, alongside the SG Ball Cup and Harold Matthews Cup during the NSWRL's junior representative season. In 1998, with the advent of the National Rugby League (NRL), the competition switched to the current under-20 age limit and was played over a full season, running alongside the senior NRL competition and culminating with the Grand Final held on the same day as the NRL Grand Final.

The competition ceased at the end of the 2007 season to make way for the NRL-administered under-20 competition, the National Youth Competition (NYC), which commenced in 2008.

In 2016, the NRL announced that the National Youth Competition would be discontinued after the 2017 season, in favour of state-based under-20 competitions, administered by the Queensland Rugby League (QRL) and New South Wales Rugby League (NSWRL).

On 1 February 2018, the NSWRL officially announced the reintroduction of the Jersey Flegg Cup for the 2018 season after a 10-year absence.

Jersey Flegg Cup teams
The Jersey Flegg Cup consists of 14 teams, 11 from New South Wales, 1 each from Auckland, Australian Capital Territory and Victoria. In 2019, the Canberra Raiders and South Sydney Rabbitohs returned to the competition after using their New South Wales Cup affiliates in 2018, while the Victoria Thunderbolts joined after spending the last four seasons in QRL-based competitions.
Most of the clubs being colts grade teams to the reserve grade teams of the New South Wales Cup and the senior grade teams of the NRL.

Current teams

Season Structure

Regular season
The Jersey Flegg Cup follows the same regular season format as the NSW Cup, with games usually played as curtain-raisers to the senior fixtures. Beginning in early March, a round of regular season games is then played almost every weekend for twenty-one weeks, ending in late August. Unlike the NSW Cup, the Jersey Flegg Cup features three full rounds where every team receives a bye. These rounds are scheduled in to accommodate university exam periods.

Teams receive two competition points for a win, and one point for a draw. The bye also receives two points; a loss, no points. Teams on the ladder are ranked by competition points, then match points differential (for and against) and points percentage are used to separate teams with equal competition points. At the end of the regular season, the club which is ranked highest on the ladder is declared minor premiers.

Finals series
The eight highest placed teams at the end of the regular season compete in the finals series. The Jersey Flegg follows the same finals format as the NRL and the NSW Cup. The system consists of a number of games between the top eight teams over four weeks in September, until only two teams remain.

These two teams then contest the Grand Final, which is played in late September at a suburban Sydney stadium (for example, Leichhardt Oval), as a curtain-raiser to the NSW Cup Grand Final.

Premiership Winners

 NOTE = Not held between 2008 and 2017

Premiership Tally

See also

 NRL Under-20s
 Harold Matthews Cup
 SG Ball Cup
 Hastings Deering Colts
 Rugby League Competitions in Australia

References

External links

Rugby league competitions in New South Wales
Recurring sporting events established in 1961
1961 establishments in Australia
Sports leagues established in 1961
Junior rugby league
NRL Under-20s